Sebastian Arias (born October 28, 1998) is a Colombian professional stock car racing driver who competes part-time in the ARCA Menards Series West, driving a Chevrolet SS for Rev Racing.

Racing career

Early career
Arias would start racing at age 11, after his father sold his family home to buy him a Legends car. He competed in several races in his home country, and would eventually race go-karts in Europe. Arias would later gain interest in NASCAR, after getting inspiration from current IndyCar series driver, Juan Pablo Montoya, who raced in the series at the time. He and his family moved to Miami, Florida, to run late model races. In 2017, he drove for two races in the Southern Pro Am Truck Series, which were both at the Homestead-Miami Speedway Road Course. He would finish 3rd and 4th respectably. He continued to race late models in 2019, driving in the 602 Super Limited Series race at Caraway Speedway, finishing in 10th.

ARCA
On August 12, 2021, Arias would sign with Bill McAnally Racing, to drive for two races in the ARCA Menards Series West. He would officially be the second Colombian racer to drive in a NASCAR-sanctioned race, following Juan Pablo Montoya. He was scheduled to make his first start at the Irwindale Event Center, but would end up not starting the race, after his car hit the outside wall during qualifying. He would make his official start at the final race of the season, Phoenix Raceway. He started 30th and would finish 26th. In March 2022, he would sign a seven race deal with Nascimento Motorsports. It would eventually be a full-time deal. His first top-10 finish came at Irwindale, where he finished 8th. Arias also made his ARCA Menards Series debut at the 2022 General Tire 150, which was a collaboration race with the west series. On February 21, 2023, it was announced that Arias would run two West Series races (Sonoma and the season-finale at Phoenix) for Rev Racing.

Motorsports career results

ARCA Menards Series
(key) (Bold – Pole position awarded by qualifying time. Italics – Pole position earned by points standings or practice time. * – Most laps led.)

ARCA Menards Series West
(key) (Bold – Pole position awarded by qualifying time. Italics – Pole position earned by points standings or practice time. * – Most laps led.)

References

External links
 

Living people
1998 births
ARCA Menards Series drivers
NASCAR drivers
Colombian racing drivers
Sportspeople from Bogotá